Century High School is located in Eldersburg, Maryland, United States, within the Carroll County Public School District.

The school's colors are emerald green, gold, black, and white, and the mascot is a knight, chosen by the original principal, Dave Booz.

History
With the rapid growth of southern Carroll County, a new high school was required to alleviate overcrowding at the nearby Liberty High School and South Carroll High School.

Academic Team
Century High School currently has an academic team and regularly participates in the local TV show, It's Academic.

Drama
The drama club at Century High School performed Beauty and the Beast as their 2007 musical, the first school in the county to do so. In the past, they have done The Sound of Music, Guys and Dolls, The Diary of Anne Frank, Annie, The Mouse That Roared, Winnie the Pooh, How to Succeed in Business Without Really Trying, Romeo and Juliet, It's A Wonderful Life, Cinderella, Little Women, Treasure Island, Sweeney Todd,  Into the Woods, Newsies, and White Christmas. In 2016, Century placed 2nd in the state at the International Thespian Society's Maryland State Festival with their performance of The Miracle Worker. CHS was the first school in Carroll County to have an outdoor theater for the school's Rude Mechanicals to perform on. The Rude Mechanicals is an acting troupe, named after the clowns in Shakespeare's A Midsummer Night's Dream. They perform Shakespeare skits both at Century and throughout the community.

Athletics

State Championships

 2002 - Girls Soccer, Class 2A
 2003 - Girls Soccer, Class 2A
 2003 - Boys Soccer
 2004 - Girls Lacrosse
 2006 - Girls Lacrosse
 2007 - Girls Lacrosse
 2009 - Girls Lacrosse
 2009 - Girls Cross Country, Class 2A 
 2010 - Girls Indoor Track
 2010 - Girls Lacrosse
 2010 - Girls Cross Country
 2011 - Volleyball
 2011 - Girls Indoor Track
 2011 - Boys Indoor Track
 2011 - Girls Cross Country
 2012 - Boys Indoor Track
 2013 - Boys Outdoor Track
 2013 - Girls Soccer, Class 2A
 2013 - Field Hockey
 2015 - Boys Outdoor Track
 2015 - Girls Lacrosse
 2017 - Boys Indoor Track
 2017 - Boys Outdoor Track
 2017 - Girls Lacrosse 
 2018 - Boys Indoor Track
 2018 - Baseball
 2019 - Volleyball
 2019 - Boys Soccer

 2021- Girls Lacrosse
 2022- Girls Soccer

Students

References

External links

 

Eldersburg, Maryland
Public high schools in Maryland
Educational institutions established in 2001
Century High School
2001 establishments in Maryland
Sykesville, Maryland